Anthony "Tony" McDonnell (born 10 February 1976, in Dublin) is a retired football player for Irish side, UCD.
McDonnell would spent the entirety of his career with UCD, becoming the clubs record longest serving player in history.

A former St Kevin's Boys player McDonnell made his League of Ireland debut on 27 March 1994 at Abbeycartron in a 2–1 win over Longford Town.

He went on to represent College until 2007, and is second on the all-time appearances list for the Dublin club as well as the club's sixth highest league goal scorer. He was also the club captain for the best part of a decade. He played as a right- or centre-back, but in later seasons he was deployed as a central midfielder. He made 308 league appearances for UCD, scoring 28 league goals, before deciding to call time on his career on 6 December 2007. The latter period of career was blighted by hamstring injuries, a major factor in his retirement. Asked about this in an interview, he replied that his hamstrings were "[t]ighter than a camels ass in a sand storm. They say all the lightning quick players have trouble with them……so no idea why I do!"

He was a nominee for the League of Ireland player of the year in the 2005 season, and was appointed chairman of the PFAI in August 2006. He has also worked as a pundit on RTÉ's Monday Night Soccer show since retirement and still regularly attends UCD's home games.

His uncle is Maurice Swan and his cousin is Derek Swan.

Honours

Club
Leinster Senior Cup (football)
 UCD 1995/96
FAI Super Cup
 UCD 2000/01

Individual
League of Ireland Premier Division Player of the Month
 UCD (March 2006)

See also
One-club man

References

External links
Website

Republic of Ireland association footballers
Association footballers from County Dublin
University College Dublin A.F.C. players
League of Ireland players
1976 births
Living people
Association football defenders